Cyperus cornelii-ostenii is a species of sedge that is native to an area of South America.

The species was first formally described by the botanist Georg Kükenthal in 1931.

See also
 List of Cyperus species

References

cornelii-ostenii
Plants described in 1931
Taxa named by Georg Kükenthal
Flora of Argentina
Flora of Bolivia
Flora of Brazil
Flora of Paraguay